Lauren Anderson (born June 6, 1980; Milwaukee, Wisconsin) is an American model who was chosen as Playboys Playmate of the Month in July 2002 and has appeared in numerous Playboy videos. Lauren was the winner of the TV special Who Wants to Be a Playboy Centerfold?, broadcast on Fox in May 2002. She starred in the variety production "Headlights and Tailpipes" in Las Vegas at the Stardust Resort & Casino.

Anderson appeared in the March 2008 issue of Playboy Spain, on the cover as well as in a pictorial and an interview.

PETA Activist
Anderson originally hoped to open an animal rescue shelter, and became a PETA member in 2007. In multiple years she has joined protests against the American Meat Institute's Annual Hot Dog Day on Capitol Hill by dressing in a lettuce bikini and handing out vegetarian hot dogs, including 2002, 2005,  and 2007.

Personal
Anderson is from a small town in Florida. Anderson married former baseball player Reid Brignac in 2010. They have two children together.

Filmography
Playboy: Who Wants to Be a Playboy Centerfold? (2002)
Playboy Video Playmate Calendar 2003 (2002)

Television appearances
Anderson has appeared on The Girls Next Door, Fear Factor, The Howard Stern Show, and The Two Coreys.

References

External links

Glamour models
People from Milwaukee
2000s Playboy Playmates
Reality modeling competition winners
1980 births
Living people
University of Florida alumni